Enoch Muemba (born 18 June 1947) is a Zambian long-distance runner. He competed in the marathon at the 1968 Summer Olympics.

References

1947 births
Living people
Athletes (track and field) at the 1968 Summer Olympics
Zambian male long-distance runners
Zambian male marathon runners
Olympic athletes of Zambia
Place of birth missing (living people)